Saint Patrick East is a constituency in Grenada.

Members of Parliament

Election results

2022

References

Constituencies of Grenada